Rachid Bourabia (born 22 March 1985) is a French football midfielder.

He previously played for Mons and Lierse in Belgium, and Dijon FCO and AS Beauvais Oise in the French Championnat National, making two appearances in Ligue 2.

Personal life
Bourabia is of Moroccan descent. His brothers, Mehdi Bourabia and Nordine Bourabia, are also footballers.

References

1985 births
Living people
Sportspeople from Dijon
Association football midfielders
French footballers
French sportspeople of Moroccan descent
French expatriate footballers
Dijon FCO players
AS Beauvais Oise players
S.K. Beveren players
R.A.E.C. Mons players
Lierse S.K. players
CS Sedan Ardennes players
Ligue 2 players
Belgian Pro League players
Challenger Pro League players
French expatriate sportspeople in Belgium
Expatriate footballers in Belgium
Footballers from Bourgogne-Franche-Comté